The Angren, also known as Achangaran, is a river in Tashkent Region of Uzbekistan. It flows through the town of Angren. The Angren is a right tributary of the Syr Darya.

A dam is built over the river.

References

Rivers of Uzbekistan
Tashkent Region